Furnace Run may refer to:

Furnace Run (Catawissa Creek), in Columbia County, Pennsylvania
Furnace Run (Shamokin Creek), in Northumberland County, Pennsylvania

See also
Furnace Creek (disambiguation)